The Big 12 Conference Women's Basketball Player of the Year is a basketball award given to the Big 12 Conference's most outstanding player. The award was first given following the 1996–97 season, the first year of conference competition but three years after the conference's official formation. As with the corresponding men's award, it is selected by the league's head coaches, who are not allowed to vote for their own players.

Five players have won the award more than once. Stacey Dales of Oklahoma, Nicole Ohlde of Kansas State, and NaLyssa Smith of Baylor have won twice, and Courtney Paris of Oklahoma and Brittney Griner of Baylor have won three times.  No freshman has ever won the award. Only the two three-time winners (Paris and Griner) and 2015 recipient Nina Davis of Baylor have won as sophomores. Three players, all from Baylor, have won a major end-of-season national award in the year that they won the Big 12 award. Griner won all three major national awards (Naismith Award, Wade Trophy, and Wooden Award) in both 2012 and 2013, and Odyssey Sims and Smith were Wade Trophy recipients, respectively in 2014 and 2021.

Key

Winners

Winners by school

Footnotes

References

Awards established in 1997
Player
NCAA Division I women's basketball conference players of the year